Euagoras plagiatus is an Asian species of assassin bugs (insects in the family Reduviidae), in the subfamily Harpactorinae. It has been investigated as a potential biocontrol agent for Pterophorus lienigianus Z., which is a pest of eggplant (Solanum melongena).

References

Reduviidae
Hemiptera of Africa